The  is a  railway line in Tochigi Prefecture, Japan, owned and operated by the private railway operator Tobu Railway. It connects Shin-Tochigi Station in Tochigi with Tobu Utsunomiya Station in Utsunomiya. 

Shin-Tochigi Station offers connections to the Tōbu Nikkō Line and the Tobu Main Line network.

Stations
All stations are in Tochigi Prefecture.

Rolling stock
 Tobu 350 series EMUs (Shimotsuke limited express services)
 Tobu 8000 series 4-car EMUs (all-stations "Local" services)
 Tobu 20400 series 4-car EMUs

History
The entire line opened in 1931, electrified at 1,500 V DC.

From 17 March 2012, station numbering was introduced on all Tobu lines, with Tobu Utsunomiya Line stations adopting the prefix "TN" in orange.

See also
 List of railway lines in Japan

References

Utsunomiya Line
Rail transport in Tochigi Prefecture
1067 mm gauge railways in Japan